The Iowa State–Missouri football rivalry was an American college football rivalry between the Iowa State Cyclones football team of Iowa State University and Missouri Tigers football team of the University of Missouri. From 1959 onward the Telephone Trophy was awarded to the victorious squad.

After the 2011 game, Missouri joined the Southeastern Conference, thus ending the rivalry.

Telephone Trophy
The Telephone Trophy consists of an old which is hodge rotary telephone that sits atop a tall wooden base. The receiver of the telephone is painted half gold and half red (gold for Missouri and red for Iowa State). A large metal plate on the base of the trophy shows the complete results for each Telephone Trophy game.

History
Before the 1959 match-up between the two schools, which took place in Ames, Iowa, field testing showed that the telephones the two schools used to communicate with their coaches in the coaches box were wired so that either school could hear what was happening on the other sideline. The problem was fixed before the game, but neither of the two coaches knew that.

Northwestern Bell Telephone Company of Ames then decided to have a trophy made to commemorate the incident, and thus the Telephone Trophy was born.

An odd sidelight to the whole affair was that the same thing happened to Missouri the following year in a game played in Columbia, Missouri. The 1960 season game, which took place at Memorial Stadium, had similar problems.

Game results

See also 
 List of NCAA college football rivalry games
 List of most-played college football series in NCAA Division I

References

College football rivalries in the United States
Iowa State Cyclones football
Missouri Tigers football
Iowa State Cyclones traditions